Eisack Valley is a district in South Tyrol, Italy. It comprises the middle part of the valley of the Eisack, from Franzensfeste in the north to Waidbruck in the south.

Overview

The valley of the Eisack river stretches from Brenner Pass southwards down to its confluence with the Adige near Bolzano. The upper valley north of Franzensfeste is known as Wipptal, while the lower parts belong to the Salten-Schlern administrative district. The valley is part of a major transport route across the Eastern Alps, traversed by the Autostrada A22 (part of the European route E45) and the parallel Brenner Railway line.

According to the 2001 census, 85.76% of the population of the valley speak German, 13.22% Italian and 1.02% Ladin as first language.

Subdivision
The following municipalities are part of the Eisacktal district:

Barbian
Brixen (district capital)
Feldthurns
Klausen
Lajen
Lüsen
Mühlbach
Natz-Schabs
Rodeneck
Vahrn
Villanders
Villnöß
Waidbruck

References

External links

Eisacktal District 
Valle Isarco Panorama WebCam

Districts of South Tyrol